Florence Rivault (or David Rivault de Flurence) (1571–1616) was a French mathematician and royal servant. He was born probably at La Cropte, near Laval, Mayenne, France.

He was a "Gentleman of the Bedchamber" to Henry IV, and a teacher of Louis XIII. He discovered that water, if confined in a bombshell and heated, would explode the shell. He published that fact in his treatise on artillery in 1605, where he wrote: "The water is converted into air, and its vaporization is followed by violent explosion." His discovery is seen as one of the steps leading to the invention of the steam engine. He died in Tours, France in January 1616.

Works
 L'effet de la raréfaction de l'eau ad e quoi épouvanter les plut assurés des hommen Elément d'artilierie, p. 117-118. Paris, 1605

See also
 History of the steam engine

References
 Robert Henry Thurston, A history of the growth of the steam-engine, D. Appleton and company, 1903, Google Print, p.15-16 (public domain)
 Mechanics' magazine and journal of public internal improvement, Volume 1, S.N. Dickinson, 1830, Google Print, p.115 (public domain)

17th-century French mathematicians
1571 births
1616 deaths
16th-century French mathematicians